Ayers is an unincorporated community in Bond County, Illinois, United States. Ayers is northwest of Greenville.

References

Unincorporated communities in Bond County, Illinois
Unincorporated communities in Illinois